Imohiosen Patrick (born, 26 September 1990) professionally known as DJ Neptune, is a Nigerian Disc Jockey and Record Producer. He is from a family of four which includes his three elder sisters and him.

Discography 
Greatness (2018)
Greatness 2.0 (2021)

Singles
"1,2,3" (featuring M.I, Naeto C and Da Grin )
"Skoobi Doo" (featuring General Pype, Lynxxx and Jesse Jagz )
"So Nice" (featuring Davido and Del B) 
"Baddest" (featuring Olamide, BOJ, and Stonebwoy)
"Marry" (featuring Mr Eazi)
"Wait" (featuring Kizz Daniel) (produced by Jay Pizzle)
"Demo" (featuring Davido)
"Nobody" (featuring Joeboy and Mr Eazi)

Featured Songs

Awards and nominations

See also 
List of Nigerian DJs

References 

Living people
Nigerian radio presenters
Nigerian record producers
Nigerian hip hop DJs
People from Lagos State
Musicians from Edo State
1990 births